"TKO" is a song written and recorded by Le Tigre. The song was released as the second single from their third album This Island.

Chart performance
"TKO" became Le Tigre's first single to chart on the UK Singles Chart.  It is their highest charting single to date on the chart. It debuted and peaked at #50 before falling to #60 in its second week.

Track listings
European CD, Maxi single
 "TKO" – 3:24
 "TKO (Peaches Knock Out Remix)" – 3:12

UK Vinyl, 12-inch single
 "TKO" – 3:24
 "TKO (Peaches Knock Out Remix)" – 3:12
 "Nanny Nanny Boo Boo (Junior Senior Remix)" – 4:50
 "Nanny Nanny Boo Boo (Junior Senior Instrumental)" – 4:50

Song usage
"TKO" has been used in TV shows The O.C. (episode title: The Mallpisode) and One Tree Hill (episode title: A Multitude of Casualties).  In addition, the song was used in the movie Accepted.

Charts

References

2004 songs
2004 singles
Electronic songs
Universal Music Group singles